Breathe In may refer to:

 Breathe In (Lucie Silvas album), 2004
 "Breathe In" (song), a 2005 song by Lucie Silvas
 Breathe In (Phillips, Craig and Dean album), 2012
 Breathe In (film), a 2013 film by Drake Doremus